Jacob Bruce Arians (born January 26, 1978) is a former American football placekicker in the National Football League (NFL). He played college football at UAB.

Arians spent less than one season as the field goal kicker for the Buffalo Bills in 2001, signing with the team as an undrafted free agent that summer to replace longtime kicker Steve Christie, who was among the numerous players who joined the San Diego Chargers in the "Bills West" exodus. He  did not handle kickoffs, which were handled by punter Brian Moorman. Arians beat out Jay Taylor for the open position. Due to several missed field goals and a missed extra point, Arians was released near the end of the 2001 season and was replaced by Shayne Graham, after which he never returned to professional football.

He is the son of former Tampa Bay Buccaneers Super Bowl-winning coach and former Arizona Cardinals head coach Bruce Arians. Bruce was the Cleveland Browns offensive coordinator during Jacob's one season in Buffalo, but the teams did not play each other that season.

References

1978 births
Living people
People from Blacksburg, Virginia
Players of American football from Virginia
American football placekickers
UAB Blazers football players
Buffalo Bills players